This is a list of notable events relating to the environment in 1980. They relate to environmental law, conservation, environmentalism and environmental issues.

Events

January 
Joy Adamson, a conservationist best known for her work with Elsa the lioness, was murdered in Africa. She wrote the book Born Free which was made into a film of the same name.

December 
The National Parks Act 1980 is passed in New Zealand.
US President Jimmy Carter signed the Alaska National Interest Lands Conservation Act, which provided varying degrees of special protection to over 157,000,000 acres of land in Alaska.
US President Jimmy Carter signed the Comprehensive Environmental Response, Compensation, and Liability Act, also known as the "Superfund" law, for the investigation and cleaning up of sites contaminated with hazardous substances.

See also

Human impact on the environment
List of environmental issues

References